The 1965 FIBA European Championship for Junior Women was the first edition of the European basketball championship for U18 women's teams, today known as FIBA U18 Women's European Championship. It was played in Bulgaria in four cities Kyustendil, Lom, Botevgrad and Sofia, from 22 to 29 August 1965. Soviet Union women's national under-18 basketball team won the tournament.

Participating teams

First round
In the first round, the teams were drawn into three groups. The first two teams from each group advance to the Final round; the other teams will play in the 7th–11th place classification.

Group A

Group B

Group C

Classification round

Final round

Final standings

References

1965
FIBA U18
International basketball competitions hosted by Bulgaria